Marcus Aurelius Carus (c. 222 – July or August 283) was Roman emperor from 282 to 283. During his short reign, Carus fought the Germanic tribes and Sarmatians along the Danube frontier with success.

He died while campaigning against the Sassanid Empire and is believed to have died of unnatural causes. It was reported that he had been struck by lightning. He was succeeded by his sons Carinus and Numerian, creating a dynasty which, though short-lived, provided further stability to the resurgent empire.

Biography
Carus, whose name before the accession may have been Marcus Numerius Carus, was born, according to differing accounts, either in Gaul, Illyricum or Africa. Modern scholarship inclines to the former view, placing his birth at Narbo (modern Narbonne) in Gallia Narbonensis, though he was educated in Rome. Little can be said with certainty of his life and rule. Due to the decline of literature, the arts, and the want of any good historians of that age, what is known is almost invariably involved in contradiction and doubt.  He was apparently a senator and filled various posts, both civil and military, before being appointed praetorian prefect by the emperor Probus in 282. 

Two traditions surround his accession to the throne in August or September of 282. According to some mostly Latin sources, he was proclaimed emperor by the soldiers after the murder of Probus by a mutiny at Sirmium. Greek sources however claim that he rose against Probus in Raetia in a usurpation and had him killed. Allegedly, he initially refused the offer at first out of loyalty, but soon accepted. The often unreliable Historia Augusta is aware of both traditions, although it prefers the former.  He does not seem to have returned to Rome after his accession, contenting himself with an announcement to the Senate. This was a marked departure from the constitutionalism of his immediate predecessors, Tacitus and Probus, who at least outwardly respected the authority of the senate, and was the precursor to the even more despotic military autocracy of Diocletian. Despite this, he still sought to deify the emperor Probus.

Campaign against the Sassanids and death

Carus bestowed the title of Caesar upon his sons Carinus and Numerian, then, in the beginning of 283, he elevated Carinus to the rank of Augustus, leaving him in charge of the western portion of the empire to look after some disturbances in Gaul and took Numerian with him on an expedition against the Persians, which had been contemplated by Probus.  During his first campaign as emperor, he inflicted a severe defeat on the Quadi and Sarmatians on the Danube, for which he was given the title Germanicus Maximus. Reportedly, 16,000 Quadi were killed, with 20,000 being taken prisoner. Carus then proceeded through Thrace and Asia Minor, annexed Mesopotamia, pressed on to Seleucia and Ctesiphon, and marched his soldiers beyond the Tigris.

The Sassanid King Bahram II, limited by internal opposition and his troops occupied with a campaign in modern-day Afghanistan, could not effectively defend his territory. The Sasanians, faced with severe internal problems, could not mount an effective coordinated defense at the time; Carus and his army may have captured the Sasanian capital of Ctesiphon. The victories of Carus avenged all the previous defeats suffered by the Romans against the Sassanids, and he received the title of Persicus Maximus. Rome's hopes of further conquest, however, were cut short by his death; Carus died in Sasanian territory, probably of unnatural causes, as he was reportedly struck by lightning. Alternate theories suggest that he died of illness, or that a rival for power poisoned him. Another theory hints at the future emperor Diocletian being involved in the killing.

Legacy 
Like the conquests of Trajan, 160 years before, Carus' gains were immediately relinquished by his successor. His son Numerian, naturally of an unwarlike disposition, was forced by the army to retreat back over the Tigris. The report of the lightning strike was evidently widely accepted in the camp, and the superstitious awe of the troops inclined them to ascribe Carus' death to the wrath of the Gods. Rumors had been spread of dark oracles, affixing the limits of the Empire on the Tigris, and threatening destruction against the Roman who should presume beyond the river in arms. Persia was abandoned to her rightful possessors, and not till Diocletian, a decade later, was the Persian contest decided in Rome's favor, by that emperor's decisive victory.

In the sphere of civil affairs, Carus is remembered principally for the final suppression of the authority of the senate, which had been partially restored under Tacitus and Probus. He declined to accept their ratification of his election, informing them of the fact by a haughty and distant dispatch. He was the last emperor to have united a civil with a military education, in that age when the two were increasingly detached; Diocletian (Imp. 284–305), who succeeded Carus after the brief reign of the latter's sons, was to confirm and formalize the separation of professions, and the autocratic foundation of the imperial rule.

Though Carus was known throughout his life for his austere and virtuous manners, the suspicion of his complicity in Probus' death, along with his haughty conduct towards the senate, tarnished his reputation before his death, and Julian, as Gibbon observes, conspicuously places him among the tyrants of Rome, in his catalogue of The Caesars.

Family tree

See also
Crisis of the Third Century

Sources

Primary Sources
 Aurelius Victor, Epitome de Caesaribus
 Eutropius, Breviarium ab urbe condita
 Historia Augusta, Life of Carus, Carinus and Numerian
 Joannes Zonaras, Compendium of History extract: Zonaras: Alexander Severus to Diocletian: 222–284

Secondary Sources
Leadbetter, William, "Carus (282–283 A.D.)", DIR
 
 
 Southern, Pat. The Roman Empire from Severus to Constantine, Routledge, 2001
Gibbon, Edward Decline & Fall of the Roman Empire (1888)

References 

222 births
283 deaths
3rd-century Roman emperors
Imperial Roman consuls
Crisis of the Third Century
Praetorian prefects
Deaths from lightning strikes
Aurelii
People of the Roman–Sasanian Wars
Caran dynasty